The 2020–21 season was S.C. Braga's 100th season in existence and the club's 25th consecutive season in the top flight of Portuguese football. In addition to the domestic league, S.C. Braga participated in this season's editions of the Taça de Portugal, the Taça da Liga and the UEFA Europa League. The season covered the period from 26 July 2020 to 30 June 2021.

On 23 May 2021, Braga defeated Benfica in the 2021 Taça de Portugal Final to claim their third win in the competition in club history.

Players

First-team squad

Others players under contract

Out on loan

Transfers

In

Out

Pre-season and friendlies

Competitions

Overview

Primeira Liga

League table

Results summary

Results by round

Matches
The league fixtures were announced on 28 August 2020.

Taça de Portugal

Taça da Liga

UEFA Europa League

Group stage

The group stage draw was held on 2 October 2020.

Knockout phase

Round of 32
The draw for the round of 32 was held on 14 December 2020.

Statistics

Appearances and goals

|-
|colspan="16" align="center"|Goalkeepers

|-
|colspan="16" align="center"|Defenders

|-
|colspan="16" align="center"|Midfielders

|-
|colspan="16" align="center"|Forwards

|-
|colspan="16" align="center"|Players who have made an appearance this season but have left the club

|-

Goalscorers

Notes

References

External links

S.C. Braga seasons
Braga
Braga